Aura an der Saale is a municipality in the district of Bad Kissingen in Bavaria in Germany.

Geography
Aura lies on the left bank of the Franconian Saale in Franconia about 7 km from the district capital of Bad Kissingen. It is the smallest municipality in the district.

History
A Benedictine monastery named Uragia was founded between 1108 and 113 by the Bishop of Bamberg. Starting in 1394, the monastery belonged to the Bishop of Würzburg.

With secularization of the government in 1803, the territory of the present municipality became part of Bavaria. In the Treaty of Pressburg between France and Austria in 1805, the lands of the Bishop of Würzburg were given to Ferdinand III, Grand Duke of Tuscany, and he was made Grand Duke of Würzburg, a new state, as a reward for his support of Napoleon. These lands then again became part of Bavaria in 1814 (this time permanently) at the defeat of Napoleon.

In 1817, Aura was temporarily the seat of a state court of Bavaria. The present municipality was established in 1818.

In January 2003, Aura had a major flood, with many of the streets under water.

Government

The town council has nine members, including the mayor. As of 2002, seven members were CSU and two DBB.

Coat of arms
A red cross on a silver background, with a horizontal silver grill and a gold abbot's staff.

Sightseeing
St. Laurentius church was built as the monastery chapel between 1108 and 1113.

References

External links
Official Web site

Bad Kissingen (district)